The 1890 All-Ireland Senior Football Championship was the fourth staging of Ireland's premier Gaelic football knock-out competition. Previous years All Irelnad champions Tipperary didn't take part in the Munster championship cancelled game against Clare. Cork were the champions.

Representative clubs

From 1887 until 1891 the club champions represented the whole county.

Results

Connacht Championship
Galway were the only entrants, so they received a bye to the All-Ireland semi-final.

Munster Championship

Leinster Championship

Ulster Championship

All-Ireland Championship

Championship statistics

Miscellaneous
 Cork won both the Munster and All Ireland titles for the first time. There were Double All Ireland champions in both football and hurling it happened again 100 years later too in 1990.

References